The Chief Mistawasis Bridge (known as the North Commuter Parkway Bridge prior to June 2018) is a girder bridge in Saskatoon, Saskatchewan.
The bridge officially opened on Oct. 2, 2018, and extends McOrmond Drive across the South Saskatchewan River to connect to Marquis Drive, providing a commuter bypass connecting communities on Saskatoon's northeast and eastern sides more directly to industrial and business development on the city's north. Construction of this bridge, located in the northern portion of the city, was financed in concert with construction of replacement for the 1907 Traffic Bridge in the downtown core, which was closed in 2010; that project was opened to traffic on October 3, 2018.

In July 2016 officials announced that, when the bridge was complete, it would be given a name tied to Canada's indigenous peoples. The bridge was officially named the Chief Mistawasis Bridge, in honour of Mistawasis, the head of the Prairie Tribe and signer of Treaty 6 in 1876, at a ceremony on June 21, 2018.

In March of 2017 CBC News described how a berm constructed in the river bed, to channel water around where the bridge's piers were being built was providing an opportunity for urban surfers.  Officials warned thrill-seekers that construction made the water near the bridge extra hazardous.

See also 
 List of crossings of the South Saskatchewan River
 List of bridges in Canada

References

Bridges completed in 2018
Bridges in Saskatoon
Road bridges in Saskatchewan